Kvervetjønnuten is a mountain in the municipality of Bykle in Agder county, Norway. The mountain sits on the southern shore of the lake Vatndalsvatnet, immediately east of the mountain Snjoheinuten, and the village of Hoslemo lies at the eastern foot of the mountain.

See also
List of mountains of Norway

References

Mountains of Agder
Bykle